Khagendra Lamichhane is a Nepalese theater actor, writer and director. He is best known for his work in movies such as Talakjung vs Tulke and Pashupati Prasad. He entered the acting field in 1999. He has directed five plays, mostly staged at national and international theatre festivals. As a writer, he has published three books. 

He worked with BBC Media Action as an actor, writer, producer and editor for international award-winning drama Katha Mitho Sarangiko, and as an editor for its reconstruction radio drama Kathamaala. He worked with British Council as Drama Production Consultant. He serves as chairperson of Tukee Arts Pvt. Ltd.

Early life
Lamichhane was born in Syangja village. He and his friends participated in Western District Drama contest that interested him in drama. He shifted to Kathmandu to pursue his career in acting. He applied to Naachghar and started writing plays.

Career 
He wrote and starred in his first feature film, Talakjung vs Tulke and is best known as Tulke in this film. He is also known as Pashupati from his movie character name Pashupati Prasad Khakurel in 2014.

He appeared in his own play Dant Ko Dob. In 2012, he starred in Highway, which was screened at the 62nd Berlin International Film Festival.

Acting, movies and dramas

Dhanapati (Nepali Feature Film, 2017)

Pashupati Prasad (Nepali Feature Film)
Protagonist
Written by Khagendra Lamichhane
Directed by Dipendra K. Khanal

Talakjung vs Tulke (Nepali Feature Film)
Protagonist
Written by Khagendra Lamichhane
Directed by Nischal Basnet

Badhshala (Nepali Feature Film)
Protagonist
Written and directed by Manoj Pandit.

Maya Devika Sapana (Drama, 2010)
Major role
Written by Prof. Abhi Subedi
Directed by Sunil Pokharel

Hajurbako Katha (Solo Drama, 2008)
Acted, written and directed by Khagendra Lamichhane

Peeda Geet (Solo Drama, 2007)
Acted, written and directed by Khagendra Lamichhane

Kaatro (Drama, 2004)
Major role
Written by Prem Chand
Directed by Anup Baral

Sirumarani (Drama, 2003)
Major role
Written by Sarubhakta
Directed by Anup Baral

Direction, stage drama
Daantko Dob
Produced by Tukee Arts, January 2016

AtalBahadurko Aatanka (Terror of AtalBhadur)
Produced by Aarohan, Gurukul, November 2011

Paaniphoto (Photo Negative)
Produced by Aarohan, Gurukul, February 2010

Hajurbako Katha (Story of Grandpa)
Produced by Shatkon Arts Pvt. Ltd.
Participated in Kathmandu International theatre festival 2008

Peeda Geet (A song of Sorrows)
Produced by Shatkon Arts Pvt. Ltd. (First phase 2007) /Tukee Arts Pvt. Ltd. (Second phase 2016)
Participated in Edinburg fringe festival, Scotland England, August 2009
Participated in Patumthani International theatre festival, Thailand, February 2009
Participated in Aarohan national Theatre festival April 2007

Awards and filmography

References

External links

 

21st-century Nepalese male actors
1988 births
Living people
People from Syangja District
Tribhuvan University alumni